The 43rd Thailand National Games (Thai: การแข่งขันกีฬาแห่งชาติ ครั้งที่ 43 "นครราชสีมาเกมส์", also known as the 2014 National Games and the Nakhon Ratchasima Games) were held in Nakhon Ratchasima, Thailand from 9 to 19 December 2014. Competition included 43 sports and 77 disciplines. These games held in the 80th Birthday Sport Center, Suranaree University of Technology Sport Center.  Nakhon Ratchasima also hosted the 2007 Southeast Asian Games.

Marketing

Emblem
Symbols in the games' emblem had the following meanings.
 The shape of the torch represented the national competition this time.
 Style represented the spirit of sportsmanship.
 The pattern of clay Dankwian, the Suranaree, and the Phimaiwas were for the culture of Thailand.
 Striped silk represented the wisdom of Nakhon Ratchasima.

Mascot 

The mascots Sima Gomphotherium is an ancient animal fossils were discovered in Chaloem Phra Kiat District, Nakhon Ratchasima. The mascots carry the torch, wear orange T-shirt. "Orange" is the color of the province and hanging a gold medal.

Ceremony

Opening ceremony

The official opening ceremony of this games were 9 December 2014 at the 80th Birthday Stadium in Nakhon Ratchasima. It was attended by the Minister of Tourism and Sports, Kobkarn Wattanavrangkul. This ceremony presented 7 series including
 The first series: One melodie open the great legend. 
 The second series: One victory One sportsmanship. (Athletes parade)
 The third series: One royal heart to One faith of the land.
 The fourth series: One great city One Korat citizen heart.
 The fifth series: The potential improve Korat to global.
 The sixth series: The unity to blazing in the land. (lighting the cauldron)
 The seventh series: One the great of power to the great city

Closing ceremony
The official closing ceremony was 19 December 2014 at the 80th Birthday Stadium December 5, 2007 in Nakhon Ratchasima. In the closing ceremony were shown 6 series and closing by Kobkarn Wattanavrangkul, Minister of Tourism and Sports.

Provinces participating

 Amnat Charoen
 Ang Thong
 
 Bueng Kan
 Buriram
 Chachoengsao
 Chai Nat
 Chaiyaphum
 Chanthaburi
 Chiang Mai
 Chiang Rai
 Chonburi
 Chumphon
 Kalasin
 Kamphaeng
 Kanchanaburi
 Khon Kaen
 Krabi
 Lampang
 Lamphun
 Loei
  Lopburi
 Mae Hong Son
 Maha Sarakham
 Mukdahan
 Nakhon Nayok
 Nakhon Pathom
 Nakhon Phanom
 Nakhon Ratchasima
 Nakhon Sawan
 Nakhon Si Thammarat
 Nan
 Narathiwat
 Nong Bua Lamphu
 Nong Khai
 Nonthaburi
 Pathum Thani
 Pattani
 Phang Nga
 Phatthalung
 Phayao
 Phetchabun
 Phetchaburi
 Phichit
 Phitsanulok
 Phra Nakhon Si Ayutthaya
 Phrae
 Phuket
 Prachinburi
 Prachuap Khiri Khan
 Ranong
 Ratchaburi
 Rayong
 Roi Et
 Sa Kaeo
 Sakon Nakhon
 Samut Prakan
 Samut Sakhon
 Samut Songkhram
 Saraburi
 Satun
 Singburi
 Sisaket
 Songkhla
 Sukhothai
 Suphan Buri
 Surat Thani
 Surin
 Tak
 Trang
 Trat
 Ubon Ratchathani
 Udon Thani
 Uthai Thani
 Uttaradit
 Yala
 Yasothon

Sports

Official sports

Air sports
Archery
Athletics
Badminton
Basketball
Billiards and snooker
Bodybuilding
Bowling
Bridge
Boxing
Cricket
Cycling
Dancesport
Extreme sports
Equestrian
Fencing
Field hockey
Football
Gymnastics
Go
Golf
Handball
Judo
Kabaddi
Karate
Muay Thai
Petanque
Pencaksilat
Rugby football
Sepak takraw
Shooting
Softball
Swimming
Table tennis
Taekwondo
Tennis
Volleyball
Weightlifting
Woodball
Wrestling
Wushu

Demonstration sports
Makruk
Practical shooting

Venues

80th Birthday Stadium (Main Stadium)
 Nakhon Ratchasima Municipality Stadium
 Camp Suranaree Stadium
 Suranaree University of Technology
 Nakhon Ratchasima Rajabhat University
 Nakhon Ratchasima Rajabhat University
 Vongchavalitkul University 
 Rajsima Wittayalai School
 Thesaban 4 School
 Yothinnukun School
 Aerial and aviation Stadium, Mueang Mai Kokkruat
 The Mall Nakhonratchasima
 Klang Plaza Chomsurang
 Mittraphap Road (Nakhon Ratchasima - Sikhio)
 North Star Equestrian Centre
 Mountain Creek Golf Resort and Residences
 Huaiyang Reservoir
 Khao Noen Makha
 Practical Shooting Stadium, Sports Authority of Thailand Region 3

Medal tally
Suphan Buri led the medal table for the second consecutive time. A total of 77 Provinces won at least one medal, 65 Provinces won at least one gold medal, 11 Provinces won at least one silver medal and 1 Province won at least one bronze medal. The host province, Nakhon Ratchansima, is highlighted.

References

External links
 

National Games
Thailand National Games
National Games
Thailand National Games
National Games